Chambers Building may refer to:

Australia
Central Chambers (Fremantle), Western Australia

Canada
Central Chambers (Ottawa), Ontario, a National Historic Site

Pakistan
KHCAA Golden Jubilee Chamber Complex, Kochi

United Kingdom
Oriel Chambers, Liverpool, England
Crypt Chambers, Chester, England
Dunfermline City Chambers, Scotland
Glasgow City Chambers, Glasgow, Scotland
Chambers Institution, Peebles, Scotland, home to the Tweeddale Museum and Gallery

United States
Richard H. Chambers United States Court of Appeals, Pasadena, California
Chambers Building (Kansas City, Missouri), listed on the National Register of Historic Places (NRHP)
Wilson–Chambers Mortuary, Portland, Oregon, NRHP-listed
Chambers Building (Penn State), one of Penn State's academic buildings
Farnsworth & Chambers Building, Houston, Texas, listed on the NRHP in Harris County, Texas
Broadway–Chambers Building, 277 Broadway, New York City, designed by Cass Gilbert
Chambers Building, a historic building of Davidson College

See also
Central Chambers (disambiguation)
City Chambers (disambiguation)
Chambers House (disambiguation)
Chambers Island Light, Fish Creek, Wisconsin, U.S., NRHP-listed
Andy Chambers Ranch Historic District, Grand Teton Park, Wyoming, U.S., NRHP-listed